Totoo TV (lit. Real TV) is a reality newscast show hosted by Maverick Relova and Ariel Villasanta that was aired on ABC/TV5 from October 31, 2005 until September 19, 2007. However, the show was revived on April 5, 2010 and ended on October 7, 2011, to give way for another program Bitag.

Hosts
Maverick Relova
Ariel Villasanta

See also
List of programs aired by TV5 (Philippine TV network)
Mommy Elvie's Problematic Show

References

Philippine television news shows
2005 Philippine television series debuts
2007 Philippine television series endings
2010 Philippine television series debuts
2011 Philippine television series endings
TV5 (Philippine TV network) news shows
Filipino-language television shows
News5 shows